Nino Oxilia (13 November 1889 – 18 November 1917) was an Italian playwright, screenwriter and film director. His 1911 play Goodbye Youth was turned into several films. He also wrote the first lyrics for the song "Giovinezza" in 1909. He died in combat during the First World War.

Selected filmography 
 Blue Blood (1914)
 Rapsodia satanica (1915)
 Flower of Evil (1915)

References

Bibliography 
 Moliterno, Gino: The A to Z of Italian Cinema. Scarecrow Press, 2009.

External links 

 

1889 births
1917 deaths
20th-century Italian male writers
20th-century Italian screenwriters
Italian film directors
Italian male screenwriters
Italian military personnel killed in World War I